Puschkinia is a genus of four known species of bulbous perennials in the family Asparagaceae, subfamily Scilloideae. It is native to the Caucasus and the Middle East. Puschkinia scilloides is grown as an ornamental bulbous plant.

Description
The leaves are green, strap-like, and grow in pairs. The six tepals are joined at the base to form a tube to about half their length. Like members of the former genus Chionodoxa (now a section of Scilla), the bases of the stamens are flattened and closely clustered in the middle of the flower; however, unlike Chionodoxa, they are joined to form a cup or corona. In the related genus Scilla (squills), the stamens are not joined together. Seeds are borne in three-parted capsules. After the seed ripens in early summer, the plants become dormant until the next spring.

Taxonomy
The genus Puschkinia was erected by Johann Friedrich Adam in 1805. It is named in honor of the Russian botanist Apollo Mussin-Pushkin. Now placed in the subfamily Scilloideae of the family Asparagaceae, like other lilioid monocots, it was once included in the Liliaceae.

Species
, the World Checklist of Selected Plant Families accepted four species:
 Puschkinia bilgineri Yildirim – Turkey
 Puschkinia kurdistanica Ruksans – Turkey
 Puschkinia peshmenii Rix & B.Mathew - native to Turkey and Iran
 Puschkinia scilloides Adams (striped squill) - native to the Caucasus, Turkey, northern Iran and Lebanon; found in mountain meadows and stony slopes up to

Cultivation
Puschkinia scilloides is grown as an ornamental bulbous plant, particularly recommended as an early flowering bulb for cool, well drained positions. Puschkinia peshmenii is rare in cultivation.

Culture
In 1993, an illustration of Puschkinia scilloides was used as a postage stamp in Azerbaijan, with a series of other flowers, including Iris reticulata, Tulipa systola (syn. T. persica), Iris acutiloba, Iris iberica subsp. elegantissima (syn. I. elegantissima) and Tulipa florenskyii.

References

External links

 Puschkinia photographs at Plants of Turkey
 BBC: Plant Finder
 Botanica Sistematica
 Plant Life Forms
 Sys Tax
 Martyn Rix, Brian  Mathew. PUSCHKINIA PESHMENII: Hyacinthaceae. Curtis's Botanical Magazine Volume 24 Issue 1, Pages 54 - 57, 2007

Asparagaceae genera
Ephemeral plants
Scilloideae
Flora of Russia